24 Days is a 2019 Indian Malayalam-language film, directed by debutant Sreekanth.E.G and produced by Adith.U.S, who also plays the lead role. The film was an official selection in several film festivals and has won many accolades and had the theatrical release on 17 January 2020. The digital release of the film was through OTT service 'Saina Play'.

Plot 
24 Days tells the story of a group of youngsters who becomes a part of a bike rally that starts from Kanyakumari and ends at the Great Himalayas precisely in 24 days.

Cast 
 
Adith.U.S. - Steephen
Ranjith Gopal - Chethan
Binoy Sudhan - Nabeel
K.K. Menon - Swami & Vikram Sir
Shajeerlal - Ikka
Risham Khan - Ron
Anilkumar - Father
Charulatha - Amma
Shyamala Amma - Vallyammachi
Rajani Nedumangad - Nurse
Uma - Riya / Nurse
Rajeev Ashok - Man in the Forest
Simi Sunny - Elder daughter
Shaji A.J. - Doctor

Production
Sreekanth and Adith are officers in merchant navy and were college mates. They decided to make the film once they zeroed in the subject and communicated through email to complete the screenplay. Major funding for the movie was done by seafarers, mainly the captains and chief engineers who sailed with Adith and Sreekanth and their batchmates from their college. 15 actors were selected through audition held at Trivandrum, conducted by Criyathmah and they had to undergo 3 days acting workshop under actor Santhosh Keezhattoor and Anuj Ramachandran. The principal photography of the film started on 13 August 2017 and the film was shot at the locations of Trivandrum, Kanyakumari, Waynad and Kannur, with the scenes involving Adith alone was shot with just the actor, director and cinematographer. The film was completed in a span of 45 days. Adith and Sreekanth along with their friends, Rakesh, Jithin A K, Jithin K V and Davis co-founded the production house 'LetGo Productions', where ‘Let Go’ is the terminology to drop the anchor, as commanded by the captain of the ship.

Accolades

References

External links
 

2019 directorial debut films
Indian coming-of-age films
Indian road movies
2010s coming-of-age films
2010s road movies
2019 films
2010s Malayalam-language films